Roztoky u Jilemnice is a municipality and village in Semily District in the Liberec Region of the Czech Republic. It has about 1,100 inhabitants.

References

Villages in Semily District